Abi Varghese is an Indian-American writer-director-producer who most recently directed season 2 of Eros Now's Metro Park.

He is best known for his Netflix series Brown Nation. He is also the co-director of Akkara Kazhchakal a Malayalam sitcom that completed four seasons. He also directed the first episode of the Netflix series Bhaag Beanie Bhaag.

His feature film Monsoon Mangoes, which was about an amateur filmmaker claiming to be the next film legend, starred Fahad Fasil and Vijay Raaz.

Abi has an independent production company called Infamous Coconuts based in New York and is currently developing several digital series.

Personal life
Varghese was born in Adoor, Kerala and moved out to United States at the age of four along with his parents. He was working at Unilever for a short period before starting his television career. He is an alumnus of New York University.

Raised in Englewood, New Jersey, he is a resident of nearby Norwood.

Television career

Short films
Varghese directed several short films early in his career.

Shortfilms (as director)

Television serials
Varghese is perhaps best known for his Netflix released show Brown Nation. The show released on 15 November 2016 and currently has an 8.6 on IMDb and a 99% on Rotten Tomatoes. Akkara Kazhchakal is a Malayalam sitcom that aired on Kairali TV from 2008 to 2010.

Television Series  (as director)

Film career
Abi Varghese made his feature film directorial debut with Akkarakazhchakal: The Movie in 2011 which was released in the United States.

The movie was based out of his earlier sitcom Akkarakazhchakal. His second film is Monsoon Mangoes.  which has Fahad Fasil as the lead actor.

He has a production house named ‘Infamous Coconut Productions'.

Filmography (as director)

References

External links 
 

American television directors
New York Film Academy alumni
Living people
Year of birth missing (living people)
People from Pathanamthitta district
Indian television directors
Malayalam film directors
People from Englewood, New Jersey
People from Norwood, New Jersey